2014 U.S. Open may refer to:

2014 U.S. Open (golf), a major golf tournament
2014 US Open (tennis), a grand slam tennis event
2014 Lamar Hunt U.S. Open Cup, a soccer tournament for U.S. teams